Casalecchio Garibaldi is a railway station serving Casalecchio di Reno, in the region of Emilia-Romagna, northern Italy. The station opened in 2002 and is located on the Porrettana railway. It is also the terminus of the Bologna-Vignola railway. All train services are operated by Trenitalia Tper.

The station is currently managed by Rete Ferroviaria Italiana (RFI), a subsidiary of Ferrovie dello Stato Italiane (FSI), Italy's state-owned rail company.

History 
The station was inaugurated on 31 December 2002.

On September 30, 2003, a railway accident happened in the station, as regional train 11432, heading to Bologna Centrale, collided with a cement block after a red light was ignored due to human error. One person died.

Location
Casalecchio Garibaldi railway station is situated north of the town centre.

Features
The station consists of four tracks linked by an underpass.

Train services

The station is served by the following service(s):

 Suburban services (Treno suburbano) on line S1A, Bologna - Porretta Terme
 Suburban services (Treno suburbano) on line S2A, Bologna - Vignola

See also

 List of railway stations in Bologna
 List of railway stations in Emilia-Romagna
 Bologna metropolitan railway service

References 

Railway stations in Casalecchio di Reno
Railway stations opened in 2002